Dead Lake may refer to:
Dead Lake Township, Minnesota, a township in Otter Tail County, Minnesota, United States
Dead Lakes State Recreation Area, a Florida State Park located one mile north of Wewahitchka
 Dead Lake in Granite County, Montana
Dead Lake (Uintah County, Utah)
Lough Marrave ("Dead lake, or lake of death"), Ireland
Victoria Park, Millbridge, Plymouth ("Deadlake"), United Kingdom

See also
Dead Sea
Lacus Mortis ("Lake of Death"), on the Moon